Kürd (also, Kurd) is a village in the Jalilabad District of Azerbaijan.

References 

Populated places in Jalilabad District (Azerbaijan)